The Taxpayer Bill of Rights 2 is an Act of Congress. Among other things, it created the Office of the Taxpayer Advocate.

The Office of the Taxpayer Advocate was run by the Taxpayer Advocate. The function of the advocate was to do the following:
 Assist taxpayers in resolving problems with the Internal Revenue Service
 Identify areas in which taxpayers have problems in dealings with the Internal Revenue Service
 To the extent possible, propose changes in the administrative practices of the Internal Revenue Service to mitigate problems identified under the clause above
 Identify potential legislative changes which may be appropriate to mitigate such problems.
The Taxpayer Advocate also had to do yearly reports no later than December 31 every year after 1995 which included identifying what the Advocate did to improve services.

See also
 Taxpayer Bill of Rights
 Taxpayer Bill of Rights III

External links
 Full text of the Act
 IRS Summary of the Act

Acts of the 104th United States Congress
Bill of Rights 2